The Welcome Sculptures at the North Highland Avenue entrance of Highland Park in Pittsburgh, Pennsylvania, are sculpted statues by Giuseppe Moretti that were erected in 1896.  These sculptures are on the List of City of Pittsburgh historic designations.

References

Outdoor sculptures in Pennsylvania
1896 sculptures
Bronze sculptures in Pennsylvania
Statues in Pennsylvania
1896 establishments in Pennsylvania